Orcevaux is a commune in the Haute-Marne department in north-eastern France. The village stretches along the hillside, exposing its facades and orchards to the sun. Orcevaux was the former hamlet of Flagey and became a commune during the Revolution.

The inhabitants of this village are called Orcivalien(ennes).

Geography 
The altitude of Orcevaux is approximately 410 meters. Its area is 4.22 km2. Its latitude is 47.776 degrees north and its longitude is 5.272 degrees east. The towns and villages near Orcevaux are : Flagey at 1.3 km, Verseilles-le-Bas at 2.0 km, Verseilles-le-Haut at 2.1 km, Brennes at 2.4 km, Baissey at 3.0 km.

See also
Communes of the Haute-Marne department

References

Communes of Haute-Marne